Zhivko Grozdanov (born 1994) is a Bulgarian footballer who plays as a midfielder for Pirin Razlog.

References

External links

1995 births
Living people
Bulgarian footballers
Association football midfielders
PFC Pirin Gotse Delchev players
OFC Vihren Sandanski players
FC Pirin Razlog players
First Professional Football League (Bulgaria) players
Place of birth missing (living people)